Jayanta Mahapatra (born 22 October 1928) is an Indian English poet. He is the first Indian poet to win a Sahitya Akademi award for English poetry. He is the author of poems such as "Indian Summer" and "Hunger", which are regarded as classics in modern Indian English literature. He was awarded a Padma Shri, the fourth highest civilian honour in India in 2009. He returned the award in 2015 to protest against rising intolerance in India.

Indian Poets Trio
Mahapatra was part of a trio of poets who laid the foundations of Indian English Poetry, which included A. K. Ramanujan and R. Parthasarathy. He differed from others in not being a product of Bombay school of poets. Over time, he has managed to carve a quiet, tranquil poetic voice of his own, different from those of his contemporaries.

Early life and education
Born into a prominent Odia Christian family, Mahapatra went to Stewart School in Cuttack, Odisha. He completed his M. Sc. in Physics from Patna University, Bihar. He began his teaching career as a lecturer in physics in 1949 and taught at various government colleges in Odisha including Gangadhar Meher College, Sambalpur, B.J.B College, Bhubaneswar, Fakir Mohan College, Balasore and Ravenshaw College, Cuttack. He superannuated at Ravenshaw College, Cuttack (now Ravenshaw University) and retired from his government job as the Reader in Physics in 1986. He began his writing career in the late sixties. His short stories and poems were initially rejected by several publishers, until his poems were published in international literary journals. He was invited to participate in the International Writing Program at Iowa, which brought him international exposure.

Literary works
Mahapatra has authored 27 books of poems, of which seven are in Odia and the rest in English. His poetry volumes include Relationship, Bare Face and Shadow Space. Besides poetry, he has experimented widely with myriad forms of prose. His published books of prose include Green Gardener, an anthology of short stories and Door of Paper: Essay and Memoirs. Mahapatra is also a distinguished editor and has been bringing out the literary magazine, Chandrabhaga. His poems have appeared in prestigious poetry anthologies like The Dance of the Peacock: An Anthology of English Poetry from India, published by Hidden Brook Press, Canada.

Mahapatra has also translated from Odia into English, and some of his translations are published in the bi-monthly literary magazine Indian Literature. Some anthologies of his translations have also been published.

Awards, recognition and legacy
In 1981 Jayanta Mahapatra won Sahitya Akademi award for his poetry book Relationships. He became the first ever writer in English language to win Sahitya Akademi award. He is also a recipient of the Jacob Glatstein memorial award conferred by Poetry magazine, Chicago. He was also awarded the Allen Tate Poetry Prize for 2009 from The Sewanee Review. He received the SAARC Literary Award, New Delhi, 2009. He has also received Tata Literature Lifetime Achievement Award. He was conferred with a Padma Shri in 2009 and awarded an honorary doctorate by Ravenshaw University on 2 May 2009. He was also awarded a D. Lit. degree by Utkal University, Odisha in 2006. In May 2019 he became the first ever Indian English poet to become a Fellow of the Sahitya Akademi.

Interview

 “The Hindu: Jayanta Mahapatra - A doyen of Indian-English poetry” Poetry readings 
Outside India
 University of Iowa, Iowa City, 1976
 University of Tennessee, Chattanooga, 1976
 University of the South, Sewanee, 1976
 East West Center, Honolulu, Hawaii, 1976
 Adelaide Festival of Arts, Adelaide, 1978
 P.E.N. Centre, Sydney, 1978
 Australian National University, Canberra, 1978
 International Poets Conference, Tokyo, 1980
 Asian Poets Conference, Tokyo, 1984

 Books by Jayanta Mahapatra 
Poetry
 1971: Close the Sky Ten by Ten, Calcutta: Dialogue Publications
 1971: Svayamvara and Other Poems, Calcutta: Writers Workshop
 1976: A Father's Hours, Delhi: United Writers
 1976: A Rain of Rites, Georgia: University of Georgia Press
 1979: Waiting, Pune : Samkaleen Prakashan
 1980: The False Start, Bombay: Clearing House
 1980: Relationship, New York: Greenfield Review Press
2017: Collected Poems, Mumbai: Paperwall Publishing
Prose
 1997: The Green Gardener, short stories, Hyderabad: Orient Longman
 2006: Door of Paper: Essay and Memoirs, New Delhi: Authorspress
 2011: Bhor Moitra Kanaphula (Odia), Bhubaneswar : Paschima Publications
Poetry in Odia
 1993: Bali (The Victim), Cutack: Vidyapuri
 1995: Kahibe Gotiye Katha (I'll Tell A Story), Arya Prakashan
 1997: Baya Raja (The Mad Emperor), Cuttack: Vidyapuri
 2004: Tikie Chhayee (A Little Shadow), Cuttack : Vidyapuri
 2006: Chali (Walking), Cuttack: Vidyapuri 
 2008: Jadiba Gapatie (Even If It's A Story), Cuttack: Friends Publishers
 2011: Smruti Pari Kichhiti (A Small Memory), Cuttack: Bijayini

Translations into English

 1973: Countermeasures: Poems, Calcutta : Dialogue
 1976: Wings of the Past: Poems, Calcutta : Rajasree
 1981: Song of Kubja and Other Poems, New Delhi : Samkaleen
 1994: I Can, But Why Should I Go: Poems, New Delhi : Sahitya Akademi
 1996: Verticals of Life: Poems, New Delhi : Sahitya Akademi
 1998: Tapaswini: a Poem, Bhubaneswar : Odisha Sahitya Akademi
 2001: Discovery and other Poems, Kolkata : Writers Workshop
 2003: A Time of Rising (Poems), New Delhi : Har-Anand Publishers

 Awards 
  Kanhaiya Lal Sethia Award for Poetry - 2017 (Jaipur Literature Festival)
 RL Poetry Lifetime Achievement Award for Poetry, 2013, Hyderabad. 
 Second Prize – International Who's Who in Poetry, London, 1970.
 Jacob Glatstein Memorial Award – Poetry, Chicago, 1975.
 Visiting Writer – International Writing Program, Iowa City 1976–77.
 Cultural Award Visitor, Australia, 1978.
 Japan Foundation – Visitor's Award, Japan, 1980.

 Appearances in the following poetry Anthologies 
 A New Book of Indian Poems In English (2000) ed. by Gopi Kottoor and published by Poetry Chain and Writers Workshop, Calcutta
 Ten Twentieth-Century Indian Poets (1976) ed. by R. Parthasarathy and published by Oxford University Press, New Delhi

Further reading
 2001: Bijay Kumar Das, The Poetry of Jayanta Mahapatra: 3rd revised and enlarged edition; New Delhi: Atlantic, 
 2006: Jaydeep Sarangi and Gauri Shankar Jha (eds), The Indian Imagination of Jayanta Mahapatra, New Delhi: Sarup and Sons, 2006, a compilation of critical articles.
Jaydeep Sarangi, Jayanta Mahapatra Joy of Living and Loving in His Poetry, Aavishkar Publishers' Distributors, 2012, . Printed INR: 600.00, hardcover, 162 pp.
 Zinia Mitra, Poetry of Jayanta Mahapatra Imagery and Experiential Identity, Authorspress,2012, Hardcover, INR:500,172pp
The Poetry of Jayanta Mahapatra: Themes & Imagery by Vivekanand Jha, New Delhi: Authorspress,2013 
 Shiba Shankar Nath,"The Poetry of Jayanta Mahapatra:A Study in Imagery", Delhi:Authorspress,2014,.Printed INR:   700.00, hardcover,173 pp.Rock Pebbles'', Vol. XV No.1, January–June 2011(a special issue on Jayanta Mahapatra)

See also

 Biodata of Jayanta Mahapatra 
 List of Indian poets

Notes

External links

 Jayanta Mahapatra's Official Homepage

1928 births
Living people
Recipients of the Sahitya Akademi Award in English
Recipients of the Padma Shri in literature & education
Recipients of the Gangadhar National Award
Poets from Odisha
Indian male poets
English-language poets from India
Odia-language poets
21st-century Indian poets
International Writing Program alumni
20th-century Indian poets
20th-century Indian male writers
21st-century Indian male writers
Recipients of the Sahitya Akademi Fellowship